Robin Leonard Alfeld is a New Zealand rugby league player who represented New Zealand.

Playing career
Alfeld played for the Hornby Panthers in the Canterbury Rugby League competition between 1976 and 1985, scoring 116 tries for his club - a Hornby club record. He played for Canterbury between 1977 and 1985, scoring 18 tries in 28 matches. Alfeld also played 18 games for the South Island between 1979 and 1985.

Alfeld retired in 1985 due to injury.

Representative career
Alfeld played one test match for the New Zealand national rugby league team in 1981 against Papua New Guinea. He also played for Oceania against Europe in 1983 as part of the French Rugby League 50th anniversary celebrations and was a replacement for the New Zealand XIII that played Queensland in 1984.

References

1956 births
Living people
Canterbury rugby league team players
Hornby Panthers players
New Zealand national rugby league team players
New Zealand rugby league players
Place of birth missing (living people)
Rugby league fullbacks
Rugby league wingers
South Island rugby league team players